DMPK may refer to:

 Dystrophia myotonica protein kinase or myotonic dystrophy protein kinase
 Drug metabolism and pharmacokinetics